Lee Robert Sandford (born 22 April 1968) is an English former footballer who made more than 480 first-team appearances as a defender. He played in the Football League for Portsmouth, Stoke City, Sheffield United, Reading and Stockport County.

Career
Sandford was born in Lambeth but moved to Basingstoke where he trialed for the local team Basingstoke Town. He was spotted by scouts at Portsmouth and signed on as a professional in December 1985. His coach was Alan Ball and once Ball had replaced Bobby Campbell as manager he promoted Sandford to the first team. He made 90 appearances for Pompey in five seasons before new manager John Gregory made it clear he did not want him in the first team. So Sandford received an offer from Stoke City where Ball had gone to and he joined them for a fee of £140,000.

He instantly became a regular at the Victoria Ground but was unable to prevent Stoke suffering relegation in 1989–90. Ball was feeling the wrath of the Stoke support as did most of his signings and Ball was sacked in January 1991 as Stoke went on to finish in their lowest ever position in 1990–91. New manager Lou Macari's fitness regime's benefited Sandford greatly and he became a vital member of the team at Stoke. From left-back he would provide great service for the pacey Mark Stein to run on to and provided him with the winning goal in the 1992 Football League Trophy Final. He played in 52 matches in 1992–93 as Stoke won the Second Division title. He remained at Stoke until the 1995–96 season which saw him playing in every match that season. He left Stoke in July 1996 for Sheffield United after making 324 appearances for Stoke scoring 13 goals.

As at Stoke, Sandford became popular with Blades fans, making 142 league starts for the Bramall Lane outfit. He went on loan on two occasions while he was at United; firstly in 1997 Sandford played five matches for Reading and in 2001 he played seven matches for Stockport County. Released from his contract at the end of the 2001–02 season he had trials at Bournemouth and Mansfield Town. Sandford finished his career at non-league Woking before retiring.

Personal life
After retiring from football, Sandford set up his own stock trading coaching business. www.tradingcollege.co.uk. In 2014, he released his autobiography titled: Goals To Gold.

Career statistics
Source:

Honours
 Stoke City
 Football League Second Division champions: 1992–93
 Football League Trophy winner: 1992

References

External links
 

1968 births
Living people
English footballers
Sportspeople from Basingstoke
Association football defenders
Portsmouth F.C. players
Stoke City F.C. players
Sheffield United F.C. players
Reading F.C. players
Stockport County F.C. players
Woking F.C. players
English Football League players
National League (English football) players
Footballers from Hampshire